The Wuling Rongguang is a five-door, five- to eight-seater microvan produced by SAIC-GM-Wuling.

Overview
The Wuling Rongguang was originally introduced during the 2008 Beijing Auto Show.

The Wuling Rongguang has engine options including a 1.2 liter inline-four engine producing 82 hp or a 1.5 liter inline-four engine producing 107hp. Both engine options are mated to a 5-speed manual gearbox.

Wuling Rongguang Extended Version
The Wuling Rongguang Extended Version is an extended version of the regular Wuling Rongguang, with wheelbase extended to 3050mm and 4490mm. With dimensions: 4490mm/1615mm/1900mm

Wuling Rongguang single and crew cab
Wuling Rongguang single and crew cab are pickup versions of the regular Wuling Rongguang. SAIC-GM-Wuling launched the updated facelift version of the Wuling Rongguang pickup in July 2018. The Wuling Rongguang pickup is powered by a choice of 1.5 liter or 1.8 liter engines, with prices ranging between 45,800 yuan and 52,800 yuan.

Wuling EV50 and Wuling Dianka
The Wuling EV50 is the electric panel van variant of the Wuling Rongguang Extended Version created for the logistics industry. The Wuling EV50 is available with a 60 kW motor and two battery options. The higher trim is available with a 43,2 kWh battery that weighs 332 kg and has an energy density of 130,12 Wh/kg that is capable of a 300 km (186 miles) range. The lower trim is available with a 41,86 kWh kWh battery that weighs 308 kg and has an energy density of 135,91 Wh/kg that is capable of a 245 km (152 miles) range. Wuling claims that the LFP battery packs will last for at least 2 million kilometers and the starting price for the Wuling EV50 is 108,000 yuan (13,596 euros).

The EV50 is also available as a pickup or chassis cab version called the Wuling Dianka, meaning electric truck. The Dianka is equipped with the same powertrain as the EV50 delivering 82hp and 255 to 300km of range.

BYD V3
The BYD V3 is a rebadged version of the Wuling EV50 body produced by BYD. Despite the exterior body being shared by the Wuling EV50, the mechanical parts were developed inhouse by BYD and utilizes BYD's blade battery layout. The battery capacity of the BYD V3 is 47.52kWh, and supports a range of 330km and the DC fast charging takes 1.2 hours. BYD V3 uses a permanent magnet synchronous motor with a maximum power of 75kW and an output of 220N·m of torque.

BAW Xiaohema
The BAW Xiaohema (北京牌 小河马) is another rebadged version of the Wuling EV50 produced by BAW. The Xiaohema or Little Hippo is codenamed BAW5030XXY6Z541BEV and is produced in Hebei. The exterior body is shared with the Wuling EV50 and the top speed is 90km/h.

Wuling Rongguang S
The Wuling Rongguang S is a facelift version of the regular Wuling Rongguang, and later replaced the regular Wuling Rongguang in its market place. It features a fully redesigned body. With dimensions: 4135mm/1660mm/1870mm.

Wuling Rongguang V
A largely different vehicle which has a body style closer to a compact MPV. The Wuling Rongguang V is actually a rebadged Wuling Hongguang V.

Chevrolet N300/Move
The Chevrolet N300 is a rebadged Wuling Rongguang for sale in emerging markets such as Ecuador and others around the world except for Africa. The rebadged Wuling Rongguang Pickup Truck was a result of GM's joint venture with China's Wuling Motors. The partnership forms under the SAIC-GM-Wuling joint venture. The Chevrolet N300 was positioned above the Chevrolet N200, a rebadged Wuling Hongtu in a few other markets. According to GM International Operations Vice President, Sales, Marketing and Aftersales Mark Barnes, “The Chevrolet N300s are robust vehicles well suited for challenging off-road driving and the weather conditions faced by users in emerging markets.”

The Chevrolet Move is a rebadged Wuling Rongguang assembled in 6 October City, Egypt by GM Egypt from kits supplied by SAIC-GM-Wuling (SGMW) in China. Egyptian assembly of the Chevrolet Move started in the third quarter of 2012. The Chevrolet Move is the first Chinese vehicle to be assembled by GM Egypt. It is also the first SGMW model to be assembled outside the home market of China. However, the Chevrolet Move will be the second SGMW vehicle to be sold by GM in Egypt. The first was the Chevrolet N200 passenger van which was sold in Egypt and other African countries beginning in 2009. The Chevrolet N200 is no longer sold in Egypt as of 2022.

Safety 
The Chinese-made N300 in its most basic Latin American configuration with no airbags, no ABS and no ESC received 0 stars for adult occupants and 1 star for toddlers from Latin NCAP in 2017.

References

External links

 
 Chevrolet N300 (Paraguay) (rebadged Wuling Rongguang)

Rongguang
Microvans
Minivans
Latin NCAP small MPVs
Cars introduced in 2008
2010s cars
Cars of China
Production electric cars